Hellbrunn Palace is an early Baroque villa of palatial size, near Morzg, a southern district of the city of Salzburg, Austria. It was built in 1613–19 by Markus Sittikus von Hohenems, Prince-Archbishop of Salzburg, and named for the "clear spring" that supplied it. Hellbrunn was only meant for use as a day residence in summer, as the Archbishop usually returned to Salzburg in the evening; therefore, there is no bedroom in Hellbrunn.

Overview

The schloss is also famous for its jeux d'eau (watergames) in the grounds, which are a popular tourist attraction in the summer months. These games were conceived by Markus Sittikus, a man with a keen sense of humour, as a series of practical jokes to be performed on guests. Notable features include stone seats around a stone dining table through which a water conduit sprays water into the seat of the guests when the mechanism is activated, and hidden fountains that surprise and spray guests while they partake in the tour. Other features are a mechanical, water-operated and music-playing theatre built in 1750 including some 200 automata showing various professions at work, a grotto and a crown being pushed up and down by a jet of water, symbolising the rise and fall of power. At all of these there is always a spot which is never wet: that was where the Archbishop stood or sat, to which there is no water conduit and which is today occupied by the tour guide.

Hellbrunn stands in a large park with a neighboring zoo, a stone theater and a small building known as the Monatschlössl, or the "little month-palace", as it was built during the period of one month after a visitor commented to Sittikus that a building on the hill would improve the view from one of the schloss' windows. The archbishop took heed of his advice, and when the visitor returned a month later the Monatschlössl was built. It now houses the ethnographical section of the Carolina Augusteum Museum of Salzburg.

Coin

The castle is so popular and famous that it was the subject of a collectors coin: the Austrian 10 euro Castle of Hellbrunn Coin, minted on April 21, 2004. The obverse depicts the main access to the castle from its forecourt. In the background there are mountains of Salzburg on the northern rim of the alpine chain.

See also
King Alfonso II of Naples and the Villa Poggio Reale – surprise jets of water in the garden.

External links

www.hellbrunn.at – Schloss, Park und Wasserspiele Hellbrunn
www.salzburg-zoo.at – Tiergarten Hellbrunn 
Volkskundemuseum im Monatsschlössl
Mehr Infos zum Schloss Hellbrunn
Garden History: Schloss Hellbrunn
Salzburg Tourist Office –  salzburg city tourist board website.

Houses in Austria
Castles in Salzburg
Tourist attractions in Salzburg
Museums in Salzburg (state)
Gardens in Austria
History museums in Austria
1619 establishments in Austria
Establishments in the Prince-Archbishopric of Salzburg